Crocidium multicaule is a species of flowering plant in the daisy family known by the common name spring gold.

Description
Crocidium multicaule is a small annual, typically not exceeding  in height when in flower. It grows from a low small patch of somewhat fleshy leaves at the ground and erects several tall thin stems, each of which is topped by a single flower head. The flower head is made up of five to 13 (usually 8) lemon yellow ray florets, each up to a centimeter long. The center of the head is filled with tiny disc florets, in a similar shade of bright yellow. The fruits are fuzzy brown achenes only one or two millimeters long which turn gluey when wet.

Range and habitat
Crocidium multicaule is native to western North America from British Columbia to California, where it can be found in varied habitats from grassland to woodland, mostly in dry open habitat.

Gallery

References

External links
Jepson Manual Treatment
USDA Plants Profile
Photo gallery

Senecioneae
Flora of North America
Plants described in 1834